Fanon may refer to:
 Frantz Fanon, Martiniquais-French political philosopher
 Papal fanon, an ecclesiastical garment
 Fanon (fiction), fan-based fictional canon
 A division of the French Indian rupee